Ahmad Effendi Jalabi was the mayor of Haifa between the years 1878–81 during the time of the Turkish Empire.

See also
 Russo-Turkish War (1877–1878)

Year of birth missing
Year of death missing
Mayors of Haifa
Political office-holders in the Ottoman Empire
19th-century people from the Ottoman Empire

de:Ahmad Effendi Jalabi